Indefinite may refer to:

 the opposite of definite in grammar
 indefinite article
 indefinite pronoun
 Indefinite integral, another name for the antiderivative
 Indefinite forms in algebra, see definite quadratic forms
 an indefinite matrix

See also
 Eternity
 NaN
 Undefined (disambiguation)